Clintwood is a town in Dickenson County, Virginia, United States. The population was 1,414 at the 2010 census, with an estimated population of 1,304 in 2018. It is the county seat of Dickenson County.

Although originally called "Holly Creek" after a small stream that runs through the town, it was later named "Clintwood" after Major Henry Clinton Wood, a Confederate officer in the 37th Virginia Infantry Regiment.

History
Clintwood, Virginia was founded in 1829 by John "Holly Creek John" Mullins.  In June 1948, the town of Clintwood elected an all-female town council for the period from 1948 to 1950. The "Petticoat Government", as it was nicknamed, implemented change in many areas, including cleanup of the town, eliminating parking problems, organizing a systematic garbage disposal system, eliminating several traffic hazards, organizing the town's fire department, and purchasing a fire truck. The "Petticoat Government" received the attention of Lady Astor, a member of the British Parliament who expressed a desire to visit Clintwood to see how the experiment was going. The town was also featured in broadcasts by the Voice of America.

Geography
Clintwood is located in northwestern Dickenson County at  (37.150054, −82.456698). Virginia State Route 83 passes through the town, leading east  to Clinchco and west  to Pound.

Climate
Owing to its altitude, Clintwood has an oceanic climate (Köppen climate classification Cfb).

Demographics

As of the census of 2000, there were 1,549 people, 672 households, and 426 families residing in the town. The population density was 812.0 people per square mile (313.1 per km2). There were 756 housing units at an average density of 396.3 per square mile (152.8 per km2). The racial makeup of the town was 98.52% White, 0.19% African American, 0.19% Native American, 0.13% Asian, and 0.97% from two or more races. Hispanic or Latino of any race were 0.52% of the population.

There were 672 households, out of which 21.9% had children under the age of 18 living with them, 44.8% were married couples living together, 15.5% had a female householder with no husband present, and 36.5% were non-families. 33.8% of all households were made up of individuals, and 17.7% had someone living alone who was 65 years of age or older. The average household size was 2.10 and the average family size was 2.65.

In the town, the population was spread out, with 16.5% under the age of 18, 8.3% from 18 to 24, 23.2% from 25 to 44, 27.8% from 45 to 64, and 24.3% who were 65 years of age or older. The median age was 46 years. For every 100 females, there were 84.4 males. For every 100 females age 18 and over, there were 81.5 males.

The median income for a household in the town was $22,663, and the median income for a family was $30,833. Males had a median income of $29,844 versus $21,250 for females. The per capita income for the town was $16,323. About 16.0% of families and 21.6% of the population were below the poverty line, including 30.5% of those under age 18 and 16.7% of those age 65 or over.

Education
 Ridgeview High School (Grades 9 – 12)
 Ridgeview Middle School (Grades 6 – 8)
 Clintwood Elementary School (Grades Pre-K – 5)
 Dickenson Center for Education and Research
 Dickenson County Career Center

Industry
Serco North America
Kids Central & Dickenson County Child Care Center
Range Resources 
Dickenson Research and Education Center (many businesses also have offices here)
Appalachian Power
Marty Materials
Dickenson County Behavioral Health Services
DCWIN (Dickenson County Wireless Integrated Network)

Recreation
Kids Korner Park
Walking track
Bear Pen Recreation Area (includes pool, park, picnic shelters, walking track, field for activities, and Pound River)
Cranes Nest River and Recreation/Camping Area (includes fishing spots, multiple playgrounds, campground with RV sites, and walking/biking/horseback riding trails)
Birch Knob Tower
Breaks Interstate Park
Lower Twin Campground
Pound River Campground
John W. Flanagan Dam and Reservoir

Area attractions
 Jettie Baker Center
 Ralph Stanley Museum
 John W. Flanagan Dam and Reservoir ( northeast)
 Bear Pen Recreation area
 Dickenson County Historical Society
 Cranes Nest River and camping/recreation area
 Birch Knob Tower ( north)
 Jefferson National Forest
 Dickenson County Courthouse
 Dickenson County Art Center & Gallery
 Lower Twin Campground
 Pound River Campground ( northeast)
 Mountain Music Festival
 Dickenson County Chamber of Commerce
 Dickenson County Visitor's Center & Dr. Phipps Museum
 Phipps Family Memorial Park

Notable persons
Singer, songwriter and multi-instrumentalist Mark Linkous (Sparklehorse) has family ties to Clintwood, and for a short time called Clintwood home.

Justin Hamilton was a former star at Clintwood High School, defensive back for the Virginia Tech Hokies and former member of the National Football League's Cleveland Browns and Washington Redskins football organizations.

Bluegrass musician Ralph Stanley was from Dickenson County and lived on Sandy Ridge in the mountains that surround Clintwood. A museum honoring his musical legacy is located in the historic district of downtown.

References

External links

Town of Clintwood official website

Towns in Dickenson County, Virginia
Towns in Virginia
County seats in Virginia